John Rafter Lee is an English actor, narrator, playwright and producer.

Biography
Lee was born in England with Irish ancestry. His father worked as a carpenter and other men in his family were blacksmiths, brick layers and plumbers. Lee himself has worked in agriculture, picking fruit, which he considers much more difficult than voice acting.

Career

Lee has narrated hundreds of audiobooks. "His trademark rich, smooth voice with its hint of a growl turns the word into a seduction", according to AudioFile. He has won numerous Audie Awards and AudioFile Earphones Awards, and he was named a Golden Voice by AudioFile in 2009.

In film, he portrayed the mysterious Trevor Goodchild in Peter Chung's Æon Flux. Other voice credits include Meier Link in both Vampire Hunter D: Bloodlust and Vampire Hunter D, Pavlo Zaitsev in episode 16 of Ghost in the Shell: Stand Alone Complex, Jason Wynn in HBO's Spawn animated series, and Aristotle in Reign: The Conqueror. John also had a role as a voice actor playing Cid Bunansa in the video game Final Fantasy XII.

Lee was also the producer and screenwriter for the 2001 film Breathing Hard, in which he played the character John Duggan. His Æon Flux co-star Denise Poirier plays his wife Carol.

He has written the plays Blood and Milk, Hitler's Head, Passchendaele, Clean Souls and Frankincense. He has adapted into English Schiller's Don Carlos, Racine's Britannicus and Grabbe's Jest, Satire, Irony and Deeper Significance. Passchendaele received its first production at the New York Fringe Festival in August 2010.

His latest film, which he wrote and co-produced, is Forfeit, which received its premier at the 2007 South by Southwest Film Festival in Austin, Texas. He is currently writing a film to be shot in his hometown, Birmingham, England.

Awards and honors
AudioFile named Lee a Golden Voice narrator.

Awards

"Best of" lists

Filmography

Film

Television

Video games

References

External links

Living people
Audiobook narrators
English dramatists and playwrights
English film producers
English male film actors
English male screenwriters
English male television actors
English male video game actors
English male voice actors
English people of Irish descent
20th-century English male actors
21st-century English male actors
Year of birth missing (living people)